Lipje may refer to:

 Lipje, Bosnia and Herzegovina
 Lipje, Slovenia
 Lipje, Croatia, a village near Karlovac

See also
 Lipie